Waukee High School (also known as Waukee Senior High School) is a three-year public high school in Waukee, Iowa, United States. The school hosts grades 10–12.  It is run by the Waukee Community School District.  Freshmen attend one of two separate 8/9 schools, Prairieview or Timberline.

As of the 2017–18 school year, the school has an enrollment of 1,950 students and 112 faculty with a 13:1 student-teacher ratio.

History
The high school first opened its doors in 1997. Since then it has renovated and expanded in 2000, 2003, 2005, and 2012. The latest renovation included "an additional 24 classrooms (including three new computer labs, a new media center, and three new science rooms), renovated classrooms, Waukee Fieldhouse, and additional locker rooms." The new fieldhouse has created some controversy because of its considerable cost (nearly $15 million). The gym's large video screen features such amenities as instant replay and player introduction clips.

Enrollment
As of the 2018–2019 school year, there were 2,081 students enrolled at Waukee High School. This number has grown exponentially over the years, as Waukee is one of the fastest growing school districts in Iowa.

During the 2010–2011 school year, up to 90% of enrolled students were white. Waukee High School has been slowly becoming more diverse ever since. During the 2018–2019 school year, 81% of enrolled students were white.

Academics
Waukee High School uses a block-scheduling system which has students spending their day in just four classes per day for 90 minutes each.  In the average high school class system (eight classes per day), students spend a whole year enrolled in their core classes with semester-long electives.  Waukee's block-scheduling keeps students in their core classes for a semester with quarter-long electives.  Research has shown that this system creates better attendance rates and more Honor Roll students than traditional class scheduling.

The school has traditionally boasted good grades and test scores.  In 2012, the school tested at a 92% proficiency rate for math (state average 83%) and a 94% proficiency rate for reading (state average 84%). The school received the highest possible rating on greatschool.org.  The class of 2011 held an ACT composite score average of 23.5 (state average was 22.3).

Activities

Vocal music

Waukee's premier curricular ensemble, "A Cappella," has been honored with performances at the 2005 and 2015 National, and 2010 and 2021 Regional Conventions of the American Choral Directors Association.

Waukee has three show choirs: Spirit, Millennium and Nova. Under the direction of Matt Huth until 2015, Millennium experienced remarkable success. From 2012 to 2015, they received the award for Best Vocals at every competition in which they performed - a total of 16. Additionally, they were crowned Grand Champion at 13 of the 16 competitions (they were awarded First Runner-Up at the other three), going entirely undefeated in both 2013 and 2014.

Athletics

Since the 2006–2007 school year, Waukee High School  has been competing in the CIML (Central Iowa Metro League). In 1997, Waukee was one of the smallest schools in the state, competing at 1A and 2A levels (1A to 5A in order of increasing school size). The school spent several years at the 3A level and has since subsequently risen to 4A and now 5A (the largest class in the state of Iowa).  Waukee initially joined the CIML in the Iowa conference; however, since Ankeny has split into two high schools, the league is now moving to a four-conference format for the 2013–2014 seasons.

Fall Sports

Football
Volleyball
Boys' Cross-Country
Girls' Cross-Country
Boys' Golf
Boys' Golf first state championship was in Fall of 2010 at The Harvester Golf Club. In Fall of 2012 boys' golf won their second state title at Tournament Club of Iowa. The Fall of 2014, boys’ golf won a third state title at Tournament Club of Iowa. In Fall 2015, boys’ golf won a fourth state title at Elmcrest CC in Cedar Rapids. In Fall 2018, boys’ golf won a fifth state title at Brown Deer GC in Coralville. In Fall of 2019, boys’ golf won a sixth title at Tournament Club of Iowa. In Fall of 2020, boys’ golf won a seventh state title at Des Moines Golf & CC.  
Girls' Swimming and Diving:'''
2011 was the teamt's inaugural season.  Prior to 2011, the team members were competing on the combined Johnston-Urbandale-Waukee team; however, Waukee created its own team after the construction of a new YMCA in Waukee.

Winter Sports

Boys' Basketball
2021 State Champions Class 4A
Girls' Basketball
2015 State Champions Class 5A
2021 State Champions Class 5A
Bowling
Wrestling
Boys' Swimming
2011 was the team's inaugural season.  Prior to 2011 they were competing on the combined Johnston-Urbandale-Waukeee team, however Waukee created its own team after the construction of a new YMCA in Waukee.

Spring Sports
Boys' Track and Field
2015 Class 4A State Champions
2014 Class 4A State Champions
Boys' Soccer - The 2019 team finished 3rd nationally according to Top Drawer Soccer  and 8th nationally according to USA Today/United Soccer Coaches Super 25 
2019 3A State Championship Team
2018 3A State Championship Team
2001 1A State Championship Team
1999 1A State Championship Team
Girls' Soccer
Boys' Tennis
Girls' Tennis
Girls' Golf 
2013 5A State Championship Team
2012 4A State Championship Team
Girls' Lacrosse
Their inaugural season was 2010.  They generally compete in five tournaments a year with one at home.  The tournaments are located in Omaha, Kansas City, and multiple places in Missouri.  The team is associated with the YMCA, which sponsors the tournaments.  Combined with some students from Valley High School, this Girls' Lacrosse Team was the first high-school-age team in Iowa.

Summer Sports
Baseball
Softball
2015 5A State Champions
2000 2A State Champions
1999 2A State Champions
Cheerleading
4A Cheer State titles (2012)
Coed Cheer State titles (2015, 2016)
4A Stunt team State titles (2012)
Dance Team
Pom State titles (2013, 2012, 2011, 2010, 2009, 2008)
Hip Hop State titles (2013, 2012)

Expansion/Growth
By itself, the town of Waukee is not very large.  Waukee's school district, however, is immense in comparison, encompassing the suburbs as far east as West Des Moines and as far west as the edge of Adel. Because the district extends into West Des Moines, the district has been able to take advantage of enormous residential growth surrounding the Jordan Creek Town Center.  This growth has led the district to open a new school each year for six years straight.

Waukee High School has had to expand four times to accommodate the ever-growing student population.

Notable alumni
Jake Knott, football player
Anthony Nelson, football player
Michael Jacobson, basketball player 
Joey Jordison, drummer of Slipknot
Payton Sandfort, basketball player
Tucker DeVries, Basketball player

See also
List of high schools in Iowa

References

External links

Waukee High School

Education in Dallas County, Iowa
Iowa High School Athletic Association
Public high schools in Iowa
1997 establishments in Iowa
Educational institutions established in 1997